Robert Kántor (born February 25, 1977) is a former professional ice hockey defenceman. He last played in Austria with the Graz 99ers during the 2011-12 season.

Career statistics

External links
 
 Bio from Kometa Brno historical website

1977 births
Czech ice hockey defencemen
Czech expatriate ice hockey players in Russia
Färjestad BK players
Ak Bars Kazan players
HC Dynamo Moscow players
Living people
HC Slovan Bratislava players
Ice hockey people from Brno
Czech expatriate ice hockey players in Slovakia
Czech expatriate ice hockey players in Sweden
Czech expatriate ice hockey players in Finland
Czech expatriate ice hockey players in Germany
Czech expatriate sportspeople in Austria
Expatriate ice hockey players in Austria